Red Scaffold Creek is a stream in the U.S. state of South Dakota.

According to tradition, Red Scaffold Creek was named from an incident when two homicide victims were laid at the creek on a red scaffold.

See also
List of rivers of South Dakota

References 

Rivers of Meade County, South Dakota
Rivers of Ziebach County, South Dakota
Rivers of South Dakota